Thomas McIlwain Young (born 24 December 1947) is a Scottish former footballer, who played as midfielder for Falkirk, Tranmere Rovers, Rotherham United and Runcorn.

References

1947 births
Living people
Footballers from Glasgow
Association football midfielders
Scottish footballers
Falkirk F.C. players
Tranmere Rovers F.C. players
Rotherham United F.C. players
Runcorn F.C. Halton players
Scottish Football League players
English Football League players